Sébire is a French surname that may refer to
Chantal Sébire (1955–2008), French teacher 
Gaston Sébire (1920–2001), French painter
  (born 1895), French politician and physician

French-language surnames